Jan Vorel (born 2000) is a Czech sprint canoeist.

He competed at the 2021 ICF Canoe Sprint World Championships, winning a bronze medal in the K-1 500 m distance.

References

External links

2000 births
Living people
Czech male canoeists
ICF Canoe Sprint World Championships medalists in kayak